Seringueira Extractive Reserve ( is an extractive reserve in the state of Rondônia, Brazil.

Location

The Seringueira Extractive Reserve is in the municipality of Vale do Anari, Rondônia, to the south of Machadinho d'Oeste, in land that has been largely deforested.
The Machadinho River runs along the west of the reserve.
The reserve is one of 15 small extractive reserves in the municipalities of Machadinho d'Oeste, Cujubim and Vale do Anari that originate in reservation blocks from the Machadinho and Cujubim colonization projects, cover the former Santo Antônio, São Paulo and São Gonçalo rubber plantations, and were created in the 1980s. The main product is rubber, as well as copaiba nuts and oil.

Administration

The Seringueira Extractive Reserve  was created by Rondônia state decree 7.108 on 4 September 1995.
It was created as a territorial space for sustainable use and conservation of renewable natural resources by the agro-extractive population.
The reserve was created by Rondônia governor Valdir Raupp in response to illegal and predatory pressure on forest areas occupied by traditional populations, causing irreversible loss of plant resources and wildlife and exacerbating social conflicts.

The reserve is the responsibility of the Rondônia Secretariat of State for the Environment (SEDAM/RO - Secretaria de Estado do Meio Ambiente).
Seringueira and the other 14 reserves are run by the Association of Machadinho Rubber Tappers.
They all have a utilisation plan, and there are no land disputes.

Notes

Sources

1995 establishments in Brazil
Extractive reserves of Brazil
Protected areas of Rondônia